Falk is a given name and surname cognate with the word falcon.

Surname
 Adalbert Falk (1827–1900), Prussian minister of culture
 Adam Falk (born 1965), Physicist
 Alexander A. Falk (1900–1975), New York politician
 Armin Falk (born 1968), German economist
 Bayla Falk, Talmudist
 Bernard Falk (1943–1990), UK television reporter
 Bibb Falk (1899–1989), American baseball player and coach
 David Falk (born 1950), American sports agent
 Gertrude Falk (1925–2008), American physiologist
 Hayyim Samuel Jacob Falk (1708–1782), better known as Baal Shem of London, British rabbi
 Jacob Joshua Falk (Jacob Joshua ben Tzebi Hirsch Falk; 1680–1756), Talmudist and author of Pene Yehoshua
 James Falk (born 1954), American inventor 
 Jim Falk (born 1946), Physicist and academic researcher
 Johan Peter Falk (sometimes spelled Falck; 1733–1774), Swedish botanist
 Johannes Daniel Falk (1768–1826), German writer 
 Joshua Falk (Joshua ben Alexander ha-Kohen Falk; 1555–1614), author of commentaries on the Arba'ah Turim and Shulkhan Arukh
 Luke Falk (born 1994), American football quarterback
 Miksa Falk (1828–1908), Hungarian journalist
 Nelson H. Falk (1874-1924), American politician
 Paul Falk, (1921–2017), German figure skater
 Peter Falk (1927–2011), American actor
 Richard A. Falk, (born 1930), Jewish-American professor of international law
 Robert Falk, (1886–1958), Jewish Russian painter
 Robert A. Falk (1926-2014), American farmer and politician
 Roland Falk, (1915–1985), British test pilot
 Rossella Falk, (1926–2013), Italian actress
 Robert Conrad, (1934–2020), American actor born Conrad Robert Falk
 Ted Falk, Canadian politician

Given name
 Falk Hentschel (born 1982), German actor
 Falk Balzer (born 1973), German hurdler
 Falk Boden (born 1960), German cyclist
 Falk Huste (born 1971), German boxer
 Falk Struckmann (born 1958), German opera singer
Falk Maria Schlegel (Christian Jost; born 1975), German keyboardist

See also 
 Falck (disambiguation)

Jewish surnames
Surnames from nicknames
Russian Mennonite surnames